George Arents III (21 April 1916 – 30 May 1992) was an American racing driver. He was also openly homosexual, and despite having a wife and children, was in a relationship with fellow racing driver David Cunningham.

References

1916 births
1992 deaths
American racing drivers
24 Hours of Le Mans drivers
12 Hours of Sebring drivers